Back on the Streets is the debut solo album by Northern Irish blues-rock guitarist Gary Moore, released in 1978.

Background
The album is Moore's first authentic solo record (1973's Grinding Stone album being credited to The Gary Moore Band). Thin Lizzy bassist/vocalist Phil Lynott and drummer Brian Downey appear on four songs, including "Don't Believe a Word" (which originally appeared on the 1976 Thin Lizzy album Johnny the Fox) and the UK top 10 single "Parisienne Walkways". On the album's sleeve, Moore is depicted leaving notorious prison Wormwood Scrubs in the Inner London Borough of Hammersmith and Fulham in a photograph by Chalkie Davies.

Release
The album was re-issued in 1989 by Grand Slam Records with a revised playing order and an additional track ("Spanish Guitar"). More bonus tracks were available for download and on the Universal Music Group Remastered CD edition of 2013. The tracks "Road of Pain" and "Track Ten" recorded in the same sessions, remain at the moment unreleased. Yet another release with title Back on the Streets, but no other apparent connection to the original album, is a 2003 compilation of Gary Moore's greatest hits.

Track listings

Personnel
Musicians
Gary Moore – guitars, lead vocals, bass on track 1, guitar synthesizer, mandolin and accordion on track 8, producer
Phil Lynott – bass on tracks 2, 3, 8-12, double bass on track 8, acoustic guitar on track 3, lead vocals on tracks 2, 8 and 10, backing vocals on tracks 1 and 3
Don Airey – keyboards, organ, piano on tracks 1, 4-7
John Mole – bass guitar on tracks 4-7
Brian Downey – drums, percussion on tracks 2, 3, 8-12
Simon Phillips – drums, percussion on tracks 1, 4-7

Production
Chris Tsangarides – producer, engineer
Andrew Warwick, Mark Freguard, Mike Dutton, Mike Hedges, Perry Morgan, Simon Wakefield – assistant engineers

Charts

Album

Singles

References

Gary Moore albums
1978 debut albums
Albums produced by Chris Tsangarides
MCA Records albums
Jet Records albums
Albums recorded at Morgan Sound Studios